The USCGC Greenbrier is a Kankakee class 75-foot river buoy tender which was built in 1990 by Avondale Shipyard Small Boat Division, New Orleans, Louisiana.

The tenders push a specific-use 130 foot maintenance barge, with specialized cranes and equipment.   The vessel has a 24 foot beam, 5 foot of draft, and displaces 172 tons (full load).   There is a crew of 19 but only 13 racks on board.  The Kankakee class ships were built to replace old vessels.  These are powered by 2 diesel engines turning 2 shafts with 1,080 bhp, giving the vessels a capability of 

The Greenbrier is based out of the Cutter Support Team Natchez Moorings on L.E. Barry Road, in Natchez, Mississippi, and was involved in Hurricane Katrina relief operations in September 2005.

References
 World navies of Today specifications Kankakee class tug-type river buoy tenders
Monitoring Times online magazine
Seawaves online magazine. Hurricane Katrina Relief Ships (list)

Kankakee-class buoy tenders
1990 ships
Ships built in Bridge City, Louisiana